Cedar Valley is a city in Logan County, Oklahoma, United States. The population was 288 at the 2010 census, nearly five times the figure of 58 in 2000. It is part of the Oklahoma City Metropolitan Statistical Area. It is primarily a bedroom community, since more than 90 percent of the employed inhabitants commute to work in other towns. The main attraction is Cedar Valley Golf Club, which is by far the largest business in town.

History
Golf course developer Duffy Martin  constructed the Cedar Valley Golf Club during 1973–4 in rural Logan County, near Cedar Creek, an unincorporated place with 61 residents in 1960. Several residences were also built on the property, and the new community had an estimated population of 33 by 1980. Residents voted to incorporate Cedar Valley in July 1982. Two additional golf courses opened in the early 1980s. Cimarron National Golf Club opened in August 1992 and Aqua Canyon opened in 1994. The town population was 61 in the 1990 census, 58 in 2000 and 288 in 2010.

Geography

Demographics

As of the census of 2000, there were 58 people, 28 households, and 19 families residing in the city. The population density was 117.2 people per square mile (45.7/km2). There were 30 housing units at an average density of 60.6 per square mile (23.6/km2). The racial makeup of the city was 87.93% White, 5.17% Native American, 1.72% from other races, and 5.17% from two or more races. Hispanic or Latino of any race were 3.45% of the population.

There were 28 households, out of which 21.4% had children under the age of 18 living with them, 60.7% were married couples living together, 7.1% had a female householder with no husband present, and 32.1% were non-families. 28.6% of all households were made up of individuals, and 17.9% had someone living alone who was 65 years of age or older. The average household size was 2.07 and the average family size was 2.53.

In the city, the population was spread out, with 15.5% under the age of 18, 1.7% from 18 to 24, 17.2% from 25 to 44, 34.5% from 45 to 64, and 31.0% who were 65 years of age or older. The median age was 56 years. For every 100 females, there were 100.0 males. For every 100 females age 18 and over, there were 88.5 males.

The median income for a household in the city was $53,125, and the median income for a family was $54,375. Males had a median income of $60,833 versus $41,250 for females. The per capita income for the city was $26,766. None of the population and none of the families were below the poverty line.

Points of interest
The City of Cedar Valley is built around the privately owned Cedar Valley Golf Club and its associated housing development.  The golf club has two par seventy championship courses, Augusta and International; golf is the primary business within the city limits.

Martin also developed Cimarron Golf Course, opened to the public in 1982, and Aqua Canyon, opened in 1984.

References

Oklahoma City metropolitan area
Cities in Oklahoma
Cities in Logan County, Oklahoma
Populated places established in 1982
1982 establishments in Oklahoma